Kokila Harshani Gunawardena (born 28 April 1974) is a Sri Lankan politician, former provincial councillor and Member of Parliament.

Gunawardena was born on 28 April 1974. She is the sister of former provincial councillor Namal Gunawardena. She was educated at Holy Cross College, Gampaha. She worked for SriLankan Airlines. She was the Sri Lanka Freedom Party's organiser in Mirigama.

Gunawardena was a member of the Western Provincial Council. She contested the 2020 parliamentary election as a Sri Lanka People's Freedom Alliance electoral alliance candidate in Gampaha District and was elected to the Parliament of Sri Lanka.

References

1974 births
Living people
Members of the 16th Parliament of Sri Lanka
Members of the Western Provincial Council
Sinhalese politicians
Sri Lankan Buddhists
Sri Lanka Freedom Party politicians
Sri Lanka People's Freedom Alliance politicians
Sri Lanka Podujana Peramuna politicians
United People's Freedom Alliance politicians
Women legislators in Sri Lanka